The 2012–13 season was the 124th season of competitive football by Celtic.

Review 
Celtic went about their 2012–13 league campaign in a steady if not always inspiring manner. Motherwell, Inverness Caley Thistle and briefly Hibernian all either had spells at the top of the table, or thereabouts, but by Christmas Celtic had found a steady run of form to pull themselves comfortably clear of the pack. Celtic eventually clinched their 44th League title on 21 April 2013 with a 4–1 win over Inverness CT at Parkhead. Celtic's run in the League Cup saw them comfortably dispose of Raith Rovers (4–1) and St Johnstone (5–0) in the earlier rounds. St Mirren, however, pulled off an unexpected but deserved 3–2 win over Celtic in the semi-final.

Celtic's 2013 Scottish Cup campaign began inauspiciously with a home 1–1 draw against Second Division side, Arbroath.  Celtic won the replay 1–0 with an Adam Matthews goal, but were again unconvincing.  Celtic played Raith Rovers at Starks Park in the next round and eventually overcame a defensive performance by Raith to win 3–0, with Kris Commons, Charlie Mulgrew and James Forrest scoring the goals. In the quarter-finals, Celtic were drawn away to St Mirren, who had eliminated Celtic from the 2012–13 Scottish League Cup a month beforehand. Early goals by Joe Ledley and Anthony Stokes, either side of an equaliser by St Mirren, gave Celtic a 2–1 victory at St Mirren Park. In the semi-final at Hampden Park, Celtic won a thrilling match by 4–3 after extra time against Dundee United. A Kris Commons goal gave Celtic an early lead, but United scored twice midway through the first half to lead 2–1. Victor Wanyama scored an equaliser almost immediately and Commons scored another goal after 60 minutes to give Celtic a 3–2 lead. Jon Daly scored his second goal of the game to equalise and force extra time. Soon after Daly had hit the post, Anthony Stokes scored the winning goal.

Celtic met Hibernian in the Scottish Cup Final on 26 May 2013.  For the first time in its history, the Cup Final was played on a Sunday. This was done to comply with UEFA regulations which prohibit televised matches being played on the same day as the UEFA Champions League Final. Celtic won the cup and clinched a League and Cup double with a 3–0 win; two first-half goals from Gary Hooper putting Celtic into a comfortable position before Joe Ledley added a third late on in the second half to put the matter beyond doubt.

As Scottish Champions from the previous season, Celtic had the opportunity to take part in the 2012-13 UEFA Champions League.  However, two qualifying rounds had first to be negotiated, which Celtic managed to do with 4–1 and 4–0 aggregate wins over HJK Helsinki and Helsingborgs IF. Celtic, as fourth-ranked seeds, found themselves drawn in Group G with Barcelona, Benfica and Spartak Moscow.

On 2 October 2012, Celtic achieved their first ever away win in the group stages of the Champions League with a 3–2 win in Russia over Spartak Moscow, Georgios Samaras scoring the winning goal in the 90th minute. Celtic's home match with Barcelona in November 2012 coincided with the week of Celtic's 125th Anniversary. As such, an 'Ultras' styled section of the Celtic support called the Green Brigade organised a full stadium pre-match card display (a 'tifo') to celebrate the club's 125th anniversary. The display featured a Celtic cross, green and white hoops and 125 Celtic in written form, with supporters earning the praise of club chairman Peter Lawwell. A memorable night was completed when goals from Victor Wanyama and 18-year-old striker Tony Watt gave Celtic a shock 2–1 win over Barcelona. Goalkeeper Fraser Forster produced an outstanding performance in the game, winning the praise of the Spanish media who nicknamed him "La Gran Muralla" ("The Great Wall").

Celtic secured their progress to the knockout stages of the Champions League on 5 December 2012 with a 2–1 home win over Spartak Moscow, Kris Commons scoring the winning goal in 82 minutes with a penalty. Celtic were drawn against Juventus, where they succumbed to a 5–0 aggregate defeat in the spring 2013 to go out of the tournament. Despite the result against Juventus, Celtic and Neil Lennon won praise for their Champions League campaign.

Competitions

Pre-season and friendlies

Scottish Premier League

UEFA Champions League

Scottish League Cup

Scottish Cup

Player statistics

Squad
Last updated 26 May 2013 

Key:
 = Appearances,
 = Goals,
 = Yellow card,
 = Red card

Goalscorers
Last updated 28 April 2013

Technical staff

Celtic personnel awards
Last updated 22 September 2012

Team statistics

League table

Results by round

Transfers

Players in 

Total spend: £3.9 million

Players out 

Total sales: £8.5 million

See also
Nine in a row
 List of Celtic F.C. seasons

References

External links

Celtic F.C. seasons
Celtic F.C.
C
Scottish football championship-winning seasons